Farhad Nazari Afshar (born 22 May 1984 in Tehran) is an Iranian volleyball player, who former plays as an outside hitter for the Men's National Team of the year 2009–2017.
Nazari Afshar announced his retirement on Sunday in Osaka after 2017 FIVB Volleyball Men's World Grand Champions Cup.

Honours

National team
World Grand Champions Cup
Bronze medal (1): 2017
Asian Championship
Gold medal (1): 2011
Silver medal (1): 2009
Asian Games
Silver medal (1): 2010
AVC Cup
Gold medal (2): 2008, 2010

Club
Iranian Super League
Champions (3): 2012 (Kalleh), 2014 (Matin), 2016 (Sarmayeh)

Individual
Best Scorer: 2009 Asian Club Championship
Most Valuable Player: 2010 AVC Cup

References

External links
FIVB Profile

People from Tehran
Iranian men's volleyball players
1984 births
Living people
Asian Games silver medalists for Iran
Asian Games medalists in volleyball
Volleyball players at the 2010 Asian Games
Medalists at the 2010 Asian Games